In physics and mathematics, and especially differential geometry and gauge theory, the Yang–Mills equations are a system of partial differential equations for a connection on a vector bundle or principal bundle. They arise in physics as the Euler–Lagrange equations of the Yang–Mills action functional. They have also found significant use in mathematics. 

Solutions of the equations are called Yang–Mills connections or instantons. The moduli space of instantons was used by Simon Donaldson to prove Donaldson's theorem.

Motivation

Physics
In their foundational paper on the topic of gauge theories, Robert Mills and Chen-Ning Yang developed (essentially independent of the mathematical literature) the theory of principal bundles and connections in order to explain the concept of gauge symmetry and gauge invariance as it applies to physical theories. The gauge theories Yang and Mills discovered, now called Yang–Mills theories, generalised the classical work of James Maxwell on Maxwell's equations, which had been phrased in the language of a  gauge theory by Wolfgang Pauli and others. The novelty of the work of Yang and Mills was to define gauge theories for an arbitrary choice of Lie group , called the structure group (or in physics the gauge group, see Gauge group (mathematics) for more details). This group could be non-Abelian as opposed to the case  corresponding to electromagnetism, and the right framework to discuss such objects is the theory of principal bundles.

The essential points of the work of Yang and Mills are as follows. One assumes that the fundamental description of a physical model is through the use of fields, and derives that under a local gauge transformation (change of local trivialisation of principal bundle), these physical fields must transform in precisely the way that a connection  (in physics, a gauge field) on a principal bundle transforms. The gauge field strength is the curvature  of the connection, and the energy of the gauge field is given (up to a constant) by the Yang–Mills action functional

The principle of least action dictates that the correct equations of motion for this physical theory should be given by the Euler–Lagrange equations of this functional, which are the Yang–Mills equations derived below:

Mathematics
In addition to the physical origins of the theory, the Yang–Mills equations are of important geometric interest. There is in general no natural choice of connection on a vector bundle or principal bundle. In the special case where this bundle is the tangent bundle to a Riemannian manifold, there is such a natural choice, the Levi-Civita connection, but in general there is an infinite-dimensional space of possible choices. A Yang–Mills connection gives some kind of natural choice of a connection for a general fibre bundle, as we now describe.

A connection is defined by its local forms  for a trivialising open cover  for the bundle . The first attempt at choosing a canonical connection might be to demand that these forms vanish. However, this is not possible unless the trivialisation is flat, in the sense that the transition functions  are constant functions. Not every bundle is flat, so this is not possible in general. Instead one might ask that the local connection forms  are themselves constant. On a principal bundle the correct way to phrase this condition is that the curvature  vanishes. However, by Chern–Weil theory if the curvature  vanishes (that is to say,  is a flat connection), then the underlying principal bundle must have trivial Chern classes, which is a topological obstruction to the existence of flat connections: not every principal bundle can have a flat connection. 

The best one can hope for is then to ask that instead of vanishing curvature, the bundle has curvature as small as possible. The Yang–Mills action functional described above is precisely (the square of) the -norm of the curvature, and its Euler–Lagrange equations describe the critical points of this functional, either the absolute minima or local minima. That is to say, Yang–Mills connections are precisely those that minimize their curvature. In this sense they are the natural choice of connection on a principal or vector bundle over a manifold from a mathematical point of view.

Definition
Let  be a compact, oriented, Riemannian manifold. Here the latter convention is presented. Then a connection on  may be specified by a Lie algebra-valued differential form  on the total space of the principal bundle. Associated to the connection  is an exterior covariant derivative , defined on the adjoint bundle. Additionally, since  is compact, its associated compact Lie algebra admits an invariant inner product under the adjoint representation.

Since  is oriented, there is an -inner product on the sections of this bundle. Namely, 

.

Explicitly this is given by  where  is the Hodge star operator acting on two-forms.

Assuming the above set up, the Yang–Mills equations are a system of (in general non-linear) partial differential equations given by

Since the Hodge star is an isomorphism, by the explicit formula for  the Yang–Mills equations can equivalently be written

Every connection automatically satisfies the Bianchi identity , so Yang–Mills connections can be seen as a non-linear analogue of harmonic differential forms, which satisfy

.

In this sense the search for Yang–Mills connections can be compared to Hodge theory, which seeks a harmonic representative in the de Rham cohomology class of a differential form. The analogy being that a Yang–Mills connection is like a harmonic representative in the set of all possible connections on a principal bundle.

Derivation
The Yang–Mills equations are the Euler–Lagrange equations of the Yang–Mills functional, defined by

Given a small deformation  of a connection  in this affine space, the curvatures are related by

The connection  is a critical point of the Yang–Mills functional if and only if this vanishes for every , and this occurs precisely when is satisfied.

Moduli space of Yang–Mills connections
The Yang–Mills equations are gauge invariant.

and so if  satisfies, so does . 

There is a moduli space of Yang–Mills connections modulo gauge transformations. The set  classifies all connections modulo gauge transformations, and the moduli space  of Yang–Mills connections is a subset.

Moduli spaces of Yang–Mills connections have been intensively studied in specific circumstances. Michael Atiyah and Raoul Bott studied the Yang–Mills equations for bundles over compact Riemann surfaces. There the moduli space obtains an alternative description as a moduli space of holomorphic vector bundles. This is the Narasimhan–Seshadri theorem, which was proved in this form relating Yang–Mills connections to holomorphic vector bundles by Donaldson. In this setting the moduli space has the structure of a compact Kähler manifold. Moduli of Yang–Mills connections have been most studied when the dimension of the base manifold  is four. Here the Yang–Mills equations admit a simplification from a second-order PDE to a first-order PDE, the anti-self-duality equations.

Anti-self-duality equations
When the dimension of the base manifold  is four, a coincidence occurs: the Hodge star operator maps two-forms to two-forms,

.

In particular, there is a decomposition

These connections are called either self-dual connections or anti-self-dual connections, and the equations the self-duality (SD) equations and the anti-self-duality (ASD) equations.

In this setting, the principal -bundle is classified by its second Chern class, . For various choices of principal bundle, one obtains moduli spaces with interesting properties. These spaces are Hausdorff, even when allowing reducible connections, and are generically smooth. It was shown by Donaldson that the smooth part is orientable.

Such instantons on  may be extended across the point at infinity using Uhlenbeck's removable singularity theorem.

Applications

Donaldson's theorem

The moduli space of Yang–Mills equations was used by Donaldson to prove Donaldson's theorem about the intersection form of simply-connected four-manifolds. Using analytical results of Clifford Taubes and Karen Uhlenbeck, Donaldson was able to show that in specific circumstances (when the intersection form is definite) the moduli space of ASD instantons on a smooth, compact, oriented, simply-connected four-manifold  gives a cobordism between a copy of the manifold itself, and a disjoint union of copies of the complex projective plane . The intersection form is a cobordism invariant up to isomorphism, showing that any such smooth manifold has diagonalisable intersection form.

The moduli space of ASD instantons may be used to define further invariants of four-manifolds. Donaldson defined rational numbers associated to a four-manifold arising from pairings of cohomology classes on the moduli space. This work has subsequently been surpassed by Seiberg–Witten invariants.

Dimensional reduction and other moduli spaces
Through the process of dimensional reduction, the Yang–Mills equations may be used to derive other important equations in differential geometry and gauge theory. Dimensional reduction is the process of taking the Yang–Mills equations over a four-manifold, typically , and imposing that the solutions be invariant under a symmetry group. For example:

 By requiring the self-duality equations to be invariant under translation in two directions, one obtains Hitchin's equations first investigated by Hitchin. These equations naturally lead to the study of Higgs bundles and the Hitchin system.
 By requiring the anti-self-duality equations to be invariant in three directions, one obtains the Nahm equations on an interval. 

Hitchin showed the converse, and Donaldson proved that solutions to the Nahm equations could further be linked to moduli spaces of rational maps from the complex projective line to itself.

The duality observed for these solutions is theorized to hold for arbitrary dual groups of symmetries of a four-manifold.

Chern–Simons theory

The moduli space of Yang–Mills equations over a compact Riemann surface  can be viewed as the configuration space of Chern–Simons theory on a cylinder . In this case the moduli space admits a geometric quantization, discovered independently by Nigel Hitchin and Axelrod–Della Pietra–Witten.

See also
Connection (vector bundle)
Connection (principal bundle)
Donaldson theory
Hermitian Yang–Mills equations
Deformed Hermitian Yang–Mills equations
Yang–Mills–Higgs equations

Notes

References

Differential geometry
Mathematical physics
Partial differential equations